American International School in Gaza is a school located in Gaza.

The school opened in 1999. Islamic fundamentalists criticized the schools coeducational classes and  had attacked the school including bombing, looting and kidnapping. In 2009 the school held summer camp and planned to hold fall classes even though the campus had been bombed by Israel Defense Forces during Gaza War (2008–09). According to IDF the school was used by militants to launch rocket attacks but the school officials and local residents denied this.

References

External links
 American International School in Gaza
 Facebook page
 "American International School blown up in Gaza". 

International schools in the State of Palestine
Schools in the Gaza Strip
Educational institutions established in 1999
1999 establishments in the Palestinian territories
Primary schools in the State of Palestine
High schools in the State of Palestine